Almost and Always is the fifth full-length album by singer-songwriter David Mead. "The elegant, torchy tunes were originally intended for a Bette Midler-style female vocalist, until Mead decided to cut them himself", wrote Steve Leftridge of PopMatters in November 2009, adding that Almost and Always "may be 2009's loveliest collection of pop songs". "Last Train Home" was NPR's Song of the Day on January 9, 2009, several months after Almost and Always was first released on CD in Japan and online at NoiseTrade.

Many of the album's songs saw their live debut at the Basement in Nashville, Tennessee, on July 30, 2008. "From My Window Sill", written by Daniel Tashian, was later recorded by his band, the Silver Seas, for their 2010 album Château Revenge!

Track listing
All tracks written by David Mead and Bill DeMain, except where noted.

 "Rainy Weather Friend" – 3:41
 "Little Boats" – 2:49
 "Blackberry Winters" (Mead) – 3:40
 "Mojave Phone Booth" – 3:42
 "Twenty Girls Ago" – 4:27
 "From My Window Sill" (Daniel Tashian) – 2:46
 "Sicily" – 3:05
 "Gramercy Vaudeville" (Mead) – 3:09
 "Last Train Home" – 3:53
 "Almost and Always" – 2:47
 "Love Don't Leave Me Now" – 1:50 
 "Sleeping In Saturday" – 3:59
 "Home" (Mead) – 3:41

Personnel 
 Chris Carmichael – cello, violas, violins
Bill DeMain – guitars
Jim Hoke – clarinets, flutes
Brad Jones – harmonium, mandolin, upright bass, vibraphone, whistling
David Mead – guitar, percussion, ukulele, vocals
Tyson Rogers – keyboards, piano, vibraphone

Production
Recorded and mixed by Brad Jones (Renauldo Grant, assistant) and mastered by Jim DeMain. Photography by Heidi Ross and design by Hotel Romeo.

References

David Mead (musician) albums
2009 albums